Zelma Oakley Roberts (née Mason, 24 September 1915 – 9 February 1988) was a New Zealand-born writer who wrote several screenplays for T.O. McCreadie in the late 1940s.

Biography
Born in Christchurch on 24 September 1915, Roberts was the daughter of William James Mason and his wife Eva Mason (née Oakley). She studied at Victoria University College in Wellington, graduating Master of Arts in 1936.

After her husband Wilfred died in the war while serving in the New Zealand 2nd Division, she turned to writing. Her novel Always Another Dawn was bought by McCreadie and filmed in 1948.

In 1968, Roberts remarried Herbert Dineley in Scotland. She died in Sydney, New South Wales, Australia, on 9 February 1988, and her ashes were buried at Eastern Suburbs Memorial Park, Matraville.

Writings 
 The Black Spider (1945) – novel
The Corpse Wore Wax (1947) – novel
 Always Another Dawn (1948) – novel
 Always Another Dawn (1948) – screenplay
 Into the Straight (1949) – screenplay
The Search for Power (1954) – radio script

References

External links 
 

1915 births
1988 deaths
People from Christchurch
Victoria University of Wellington alumni
New Zealand screenwriters
New Zealand women screenwriters
New Zealand emigrants to Australia
Burials at Eastern Suburbs Memorial Park
20th-century screenwriters